Veerolipadam is a village in Thrissur district of Kerala, India. It is located in Thekkumkara Gram Panchayath.

References 

Villages in Thrissur district